The list of ship commissionings in 2011 includes a chronological list of all ships commissioned in 2011.


See also

2011